Interleukin 7 (IL-7) is a protein that in humans is encoded by the IL7 gene.

IL-7 is a hematopoietic growth factor secreted by stromal cells in the bone marrow and thymus. It is also produced by keratinocytes, dendritic cells, hepatocytes, neurons, and epithelial cells, but is not produced by normal lymphocytes. A study also demonstrate how the autocrine production of the IL-7 cytokine mediated by T-cell acute lymphoblastic leukemia (T-ALL) can be involved in the oncogenic development of T-ALL and offer novel insights into T-ALL spreading.

Structure 

The three-dimensional structure of IL-7 in complex with the ectodomain of IL-7 receptor has been determined using X-ray diffraction.

Function

Lymphocyte maturation 

IL-7 stimulates the differentiation of multipotent (pluripotent) hematopoietic stem cells into lymphoid progenitor cells (as opposed to myeloid progenitor cells where differentiation is stimulated by IL-3). It also stimulates proliferation of all cells in the lymphoid lineage (B cells, T cells and NK cells). It is important for proliferation during certain stages of B-cell maturation, T and NK cell survival, development and homeostasis.

IL-7 is a cytokine important for B and T cell development. This cytokine and the hepatocyte growth factor (HGF) form a heterodimer that functions as a pre-pro-B cell growth-stimulating factor. This cytokine is found to be a cofactor for V(D)J rearrangement of the T cell receptor beta (TCRß) during early T cell development. This cytokine can be produced locally by intestinal epithelial and epithelial goblet cells, and may serve as a regulatory factor for intestinal mucosal lymphocytes. Knockout studies in mice suggested that this cytokine plays an essential role in lymphoid cell survival.

IL-7 signaling 

IL-7 binds to the IL-7 receptor, a heterodimer consisting of Interleukin-7 receptor alpha and common gamma chain receptor. Binding results in a cascade of signals important for T-cell development within the thymus and survival within the periphery. Knockout mice which genetically lack IL-7 receptor exhibit thymic atrophy, arrest of T-cell development at the double positive stage, and severe lymphopenia. Administration of IL-7 to mice results in an increase in recent thymic emigrants, increases in B and T cells, and increased recovery of T cells after cyclophosphamide administration or after bone marrow transplantation.

Disease

Cancer 
IL-7 promotes hematological malignancies (acute lymphoblastic leukemia, T cell lymphoma).

Viral Infections 
Elevated levels of IL-7 have also been detected in the plasma of HIV-infected patients.

Clinical application 

IL-7  as an immunotherapy agent has been examined in many pre-clinical animal studies and more recently in human clinical trials for various malignancies and during HIV infection.

Cancer 

Recombinant IL-7 has been safely administered to patients in several phase I and II clinical trials. A human study of IL-7 in patients with cancer demonstrated that administration of this cytokine can transiently disrupt the homeostasis of both CD8+ and CD4+ T cells with a commensurate decrease in the percentage of CD4+CD25+Foxp3+ T regulatory cells.  No objective cancer regression was observed, however a dose limiting toxicity (DLT) was not reached in this study due to the development of neutralizing antibodies against the recombinant cytokine.

HIV infection 

Associated with antiretroviral therapy, IL-7 administration decreased local and systemic inflammations in patients that had incomplete T-cell reconstitution. These results suggest that IL-7 therapy can possibly improve the quality of life of those patients.

Transplantation 
IL-7 could also be beneficial in improving immune recovery after allogenic stem cell transplant.

References

Further reading 

Interleukins
Immunomodulating drugs
Cancer treatments